The RLIF Awards are the Rugby League International Federation's annual major international sporting award for rugby league. Since 2004 the awards ceremony recognises the best referee, coach, developing nations player, international newcomer, captain and a team of the year.

In 2007, the RLIF did not organise any awards. To fill the gap, Rugby League World magazine asked its Golden Boot panel to come up with winners in the existing categories used by the RLIF.

Coinciding with the 2008 Rugby League World Cup, the RLIF Awards were rebranded and the old award system was replaced.

Player of the Year
Described as rugby league's most prestigious individual honour, the International Player of the Year award is given to the world’s best player as voted upon by an international judging panel comprising journalists, broadcasters and former international players drawn from both the northern and southern hemispheres.

Coach of the Year

Rookie of the Year

Referee of the Year

Spirit of Rugby League Award

Team of the Year

Nations' Players of the Year

Awards No Longer Presented

International Newcomer of the Year

2004 Sonny Bill Williams, New Zealand
2005 Manu Vatuvei, New Zealand
2006 Greg Inglis, Australia
2007 Israel Folau, Australia (awarded by Rugby League World)

Developing Nations Player of the Year

2004 Jamal Fakir, France
2005 Jamal Fakir, France
2006 Wes Naiqama, Fiji
2007 George Ndaira, Lebanon (awarded by Rugby League World)

International Back of the Year

2004 Darren Lockyer, Australia
2005 Anthony Minichiello, Australia
2006 Darren Lockyer, Australia
2007 Johnathan Thurston, Australia (awarded by Rugby League World)

International Forward of the Year

2004 Andrew Farrell, England
2005 Stuart Fielden, England
2006 Jamie Peacock, England
2007 Jamie Peacock, England (awarded by Rugby League World)

See also
RLIF Awards 2006
RLIF Awards 2005
RLIF Awards 2004
Rugby League World Golden Boot Award
Rugby League International Federation

References

External links
 Rugby League International Federation
 RLIF Official forums